Mộng Tuyết (Hà Tiên, 1914-2007), real name Thái Thị Úc was a Vietnamese poet. She married the poet Đông Hồ.

In 1943 she published Hương Xuân, the first poetry collection by women poets in quốc ngữ, together with Hằng Phương, Vân Đài and Anh Thơ.

References

1914 births
2007 deaths
Vietnamese women poets
20th-century Vietnamese poets
20th-century Vietnamese women writers
People from Kiên Giang Province